Gnaeus Manlius Vulso is the name of:

 Gnaeus Manlius Vulso (consul 474 BC)
 Gnaeus Manlius Vulso (consul 189 BC)